Lubuagan, officially the Municipality of Lubuagan  is a 4th class municipality in the province of Kalinga, Philippines. According to the 2020 census, it has a population of 9,323 people.

Lubuagan Municipality, once the seat of the National Government from March 6 to May 17, 1900, during the time of Gen. Emilio Aguinaldo, was among the eight (8) municipalities of the new province of Kalinga. Some of its younger generation have migrated either in the lowland plains of Tabuk or in other provinces in search for income and employment opportunities.

History
Spanish Rule was never established in Lubuagan during the more than 300 years of sovereignty over the Philippines. However, Emilio Aguinaldo, president of the erstwhile First Philippine Republic made Lubuagan the seat of government for 73 days, from 6 March 1900 to 18 May 1900, before his escape and eventual capture at Palanan, Isabela, on 23 March 1901.
 
Upon the assumption of the United States of America as colonial power over the Philippines, the Township of Lubuagan, a unit of government at the time it was established in 1905 which was administered via the sub provincial government of Lepanto-Bontoc sub-province, Lt. Governor E. A. Eckman, an American ex-soldier was the Chief Executive of the sub-province.
 
Sometimes in 1907, Kalinga was separated and organized as a distinct sub-province from the Lepanto-Bontoc sub-province. Franklin Walter Hale was appointed the first Lt. Governor to establish a civil government in Kalinga.

Bulanao Barrio, a thriving big community of Tubog at the time, the site of which is the present homestead of Mr. Abe Umao was the target of Lt. Governor Hale as the center of this Administration of government in Kalinga sub-province. But shortly thereafter, the great cholera and malaria epidemic broke out in the later part of 1907 and continued in 1908 which almost wiped out the town populace. Lt. Governor Hales was himself attacked with malaria so that he and his official family were forced to leave Bulanao because those who survived the epidemic among the natives left.

Lt. Governor Hale and his staff came up to Lubuagan in the early part of 1909 and established their quarters and camps where the present multi-purpose Hall now stands. Governor Hale whom the people baptized and fondly called SAPAO, first organized his police contingent from and among the tribal pangats and headmen from the different villages of Kalinga to help them tame the natives who are still afraid and suspicious of the new order.

Lt. Governor Hale served Kalinga up to the end of July 1915. He was replaced by Lt. Governor Samuel Kane, who served for a brief period and wasreplaced by Lt. Gov. Alex Gilfilan in September 1916, who was later on replaced by what is now nomenclatured as Deputy Governor Mr. Thomas Blanco, a Filipino. In 1924, Deputy Governor Nicasio Balinag took over the reign of Sub-Provincial Executive of Kalinga.

The colonial Civil Government notably beginning with the administration of Lt. Governor Franklin Walter Hale up to the Commonwealth government is considered the golden years of Lubuagan, the capital town of the sub-province of Kalinga. Lubuagan at that time was the center of education, culture, commerce and trade. The founding of the Kalinga Academy in 1927, a secondary school run by American Missionaries and the St. Teresita's School in 1929, a Catholic Primary and High School managed by the CICM Belgian Missionaries bolstered the luster of Lubuagan.

The Japanese Imperial Army occupation forces came to Lubuagan in May 1942.

In 1945 during the war of liberation, Lubuagan was bombed by American planes resulting in the destruction of the Lubuagan Central School which was then occupied by the enemy. The big and beautiful St. Peter's church of Lubuagan, the father's convent and two more buildings within the compound were all burned to the ground. Lubuagan was once the capital of Kalinga sub-province before Tabuk rose to its present status as the center of learning and government activities. It is also in Lubuagan where the first instruction of higher learning (College) in the old Mt. Province was established.

(Source: Souvenir Book: Kalinga 7th Foundation Day)

Geography

Barangays
Lubbuagan is politically subdivided into 9 barangays. These barangays are headed by elected officials: Barangay Captain, Barangay Council, whose members are called Barangay Councilors. All are elected every three years.
 Dangoy
 Mabilong
 Mabongtot
 Poblacion
 Tanglag
 Lower Uma
 Upper Uma
 Antonio Canao
 Uma del Norte (Western Uma)

Climate

Demographics

Economy

Government
Lubuagan, belonging to the lone congressional district of the province of Kalinga, is governed by a mayor designated as its local chief executive and by a municipal council as its legislative body in accordance with the Local Government Code. The mayor, vice mayor, and the councilors are elected directly by the people through an election which is being held every three years.

Elected officials

Tourism

 St. Theresita's School, a Roman Catholic school established by the CICM missionaries in 1925, was once the educational center of the Cordillera. It was also used as a military outpost by the Japanese, Filipino and American forces during World War II.
 Mabilong Weaver's Village, located along the road, is the center of the ethnic weaving industry in the province. It showcases colorful ethnic backstrap weaving. Here, one can see how the intricate ethnic designs are made and how the colors are mixed. Souvenirs can be bought from the weavers.
 The town has extensive and scenic rice terraces (Pon-e Rice Terraces and Gapis Rice Terraces) cut into the mountains, rising  from the Chico River bed.
  north of the town is a turn-off with a once-busy road leading west to Batong Buhay Mines.
It has a panoramic view of several barangays in Pinukpuk.
 Awichon Mesa, a plateau situated at Barangay Upper Uma, 2 km from the town proper and between Pasil and Lubuagan, is an archaeological site where bones of a prehistoric elephant were found. It was also the landing site of American forces during World War II.
 Cadamayan Falls, at Barangay Western Uma, serves as the natural boundary of Pasil, Lubuagan and Tinglayan and can be viewed from the road.
 Tiwod Spring, the "Fertility Twin Spring", is believed to be a God-given gift for couples who haven't had children yet. Couples who take a bath on mornings and drink from it will bear children as believed by many locals.
 Unexplored Tongango Caves, located just above the poblacion, consists of several chambers connecting the mountains of Lubuagan, Sumadel and Tulgao.
 The Belalao Mabilong View is a stopover for viewing the panorama of the picturesque Lubuagan Village. Visitors who come by night are said to be surprised by a sudden appearance of a lost city in the mountain.
 Manangol Viewpoint, at the top of Manangol Hill, is where you could see a magnificent, panoramic view of the Chico River (and villages supposed to be submerged by Chico Dam IV), the "Sleeping Beauty" of Tinglayan and the hidden rice terraces seated at the basement of the overlapping mountain.
 The Poway View Deck, at the boundary of Pasil and Lubuagan, is where you could view the 5 barangays and the winding Pasil River.
 The Pudpud Chico Viewpoint, at the Lubuagan Central School, is where you could view the long and winding Chico River and the aborted Chico Hydroelectric Dam.
 The Lubuagan Museum, located in an old American house, showcases a selection of old Chinese pottery as well as other Kalinga products. It is a two-hour jeepney ride from Tabuk.

Culture
Laga Festival- From "laga", a Kalinga word which means to weave. Celebrated annually, typically in March. It is a two or three-day celebration which showcases the culture, arts, and history of Lubuagan.

Notable personalities
 Jean Claude SaclagMedalist, Kickboxing and Wushu

References

External links
 [ Philippine Standard Geographic Code]
Philippine Census Information
Local Governance Performance Management System

Municipalities of Kalinga (province)
Populated places on the Rio Chico de Cagayan